Lasse Lehtinen (born 23 January 1947 in Kotka) is a Finnish politician, former Member of the Finnish Parliament and former Member of the European Parliament (MEP). He is a member of the Social Democratic Party of Finland, which is part of the Party of European Socialists, and sat on the European Parliament's Committee on the Internal Market and Consumer Protection.

He was also a substitute for the Committee on Employment and Social Affairs, vice-chair of the delegation for relations with Canada, and a substitute for the delegation for relations with the countries of South Asia and the South Asian Association for Regional Cooperation.

He hosted the Finnish version of the television quiz Who Wants to Be a Millionaire? (Haluatko miljonääriksi?) for years before becoming an MEP.

He was awarded the Freedom of the City of London on 21 September 2007. See: City of London news release.

Career
 Doctor of Philosophy (2002)
 Journalist (since 1962)
 Diplomat (1983-1990)
 Senior Vice-President, Corporate Affairs (1990-1993)
 Writer and television producer (1993-2004)
 Member, Kuopio town council (1968-1980)
 Member of Parliament (1972-1983)

References

External links
 Official Website
 European Parliament biography
 

1947 births
Living people
People from Kotka
Social Democratic Party of Finland politicians
Members of the Parliament of Finland (1972–75)
Members of the Parliament of Finland (1975–79)
Members of the Parliament of Finland (1979–83)
Social Democratic Party of Finland MEPs
MEPs for Finland 2004–2009
Finnish television presenters
Who Wants to Be a Millionaire?
University of Oulu alumni